Liberty Warehouse Nos. 1 and 2, also known as Liberty Warehouse No. 3 and Liberty Warehouse, was a historic tobacco auction warehouse complex located at Durham, Durham County, North Carolina.  It was built in two sections in 1938 and in 1948.  Together it was an expansive frame structure on a brick foundation with low-pitched, front-gabled roofs supported by massive timber columns.  The last loose-leaf tobacco auctions were held in downtown Durham in the 1980s.

It was listed on the National Register of Historic Places in 2008. In May 2011 a portion of the roof collapsed and demolition of the building began in July 2014.

References

Tobacco buildings in the United States
Industrial buildings and structures on the National Register of Historic Places in North Carolina
Industrial buildings completed in 1938
Buildings and structures in Durham, North Carolina
National Register of Historic Places in Durham County, North Carolina